OOI or Ooi may refer to: 

 Ocean Observatories Initiative, a National Science Foundation Division of Ocean Sciences program
 Huang (surname), a Chinese surname
 Oosterhoff type I (OoI), a category of globular clusters
 In Japanese, ōi is sometimes written as ooi